Space on My Hands is a 1951 collection of science fiction short stories by American writer Fredric Brown.  It was first published by Shasta Publishers in 1951 in an edition of 5,000 copies.  The story "Something Green" is original to this collection.  The other stories originally appeared in the magazines Ellery Queen's Mystery Magazine, Thrilling Wonder Stories, Captain Future, Planet Stories and Weird Tales.

Contents
 Introduction
 "Something Green"
 "Crisis"
 "Pi in the Sky"
 "Knock"
 "All Good Bems"
 "Daymare"
 "Nothing Sirius"
 "The Star Mouse"
 "Come and Go Mad"

Reception
P. Schuyler Miller reported the collection to be "a selection of nine top-notch stories."

References

Sources

1951 short story collections
Science fiction short story collections